The Left Camp of Israel (Maḥaneh Smol LeYisrael) was a left-wing political party in Israel. It was also known as Sheli, an acronym for "Peace for Israel" (Shalom LeYisrael).

Background
The party was formed prior to the 1977 elections by the merger of Meri, Moked, the Independent Socialist Faction and some members of the Black Panthers. It won two seats in the elections, which were held on a rotation basis by five party members; Uri Avnery (previously an MK for Meri), Aryeh Eliav (an MK for the Independent Socialist Faction in the previous Knesset), Meir Pa'il (an ex-Moked MK), Saadia Marciano and Walid Haj Yahia. Other prominent members of Sheli were the former deputy chief of staff of the Israeli army Matti Peled and Ran Cohen, who later served as an MK for Ratz and Meretz and a government minister.

The party, formed by a merger of leftist non-communist groups, was founded by Eliav, who was formerly secretary general of the Labor Party. Sheli called for negotiations with the Palestine Liberation Organization based on mutual recognition and for the establishment of an Arab Palestinian state.

On 11 November 1980, Marciano broke away from the party to form a single-member faction, later renamed Equality in Israel – Panthers. On 19 May 1981 he was joined by former Dash MK, Mordechai Elgrably. The new party was later renamed as the Unity Party.

The party failed to cross the election threshold in the 1981 election and subsequently disappeared, though many former party members joined the Progressive List for Peace and Ratz.

References

External links
Left Camp of Israel (Sheli) Knesset website

Defunct political parties in Israel
Socialist parties in Israel
Far-left politics in Israel
Far-left political parties